Daily or The Daily may refer to:

Journalism 
 Daily newspaper, newspaper issued on five to seven day of most weeks
 The Daily (podcast), a podcast by The New York Times
 The Daily (News Corporation), a defunct US-based iPad newspaper from News Corporation 
 The Daily of the University of Washington, a student newspaper using The Daily as its standardhead

Places
 Daily, North Dakota, United States
 Daily Township, Dixon County, Nebraska, United States

People
 Bill Daily (1927–2018), American actor
 Elizabeth Daily (born 1961), American voice actress
 Joseph E. Daily (1888–1965), American jurist
 Thomas Vose Daily (1927–2017), American Roman Catholic bishop

Other usages  
 Iveco Daily, a large van produced by Iveco
 Dailies, unedited footage in film

See also
 Dailey, surname
 Daley (disambiguation)
 Daly (disambiguation)